Naked Child Laughing is an oil on canvas painting by Lucian Freud of a nude girl laughing, done in 1963. It is held in a private collection.

Description
The painting was actually the first nude made by Freud. It was also one of the several that he did during his career of his own children, in different ages. This painting shows his eldest daughter, Annie, then aged 14 years old, as a naked teenage girl, sitting on a settee and laughing.

References

1963 paintings
Paintings by Lucian Freud
Nude art